Massimilian Porcello (born 23 June 1980 in Bückeburg, West Germany) is a German-Italian former professional footballer who played as a midfielder. He is known to be a set piece specialist and has scored some stunning free kicks for Karlsruher SC, most notably a 45-meter hammer versus Hansa Rostock in the 2006–07 season.

References

External links
 
 

1980 births
Living people
People from Bückeburg
Footballers from Lower Saxony
Association football midfielders
German footballers
SC Paderborn 07 players
Arminia Bielefeld players
Karlsruher SC players
German sportspeople of Italian descent
Bundesliga players
2. Bundesliga players
3. Liga players
FC Gütersloh 2000 players
VfL Osnabrück players